The following outline is provided as an overview of and topical guide to the U.S. state of Idaho:

Idaho – U.S. state in the Rocky Mountain area of the United States.  The state's largest city and capital is Boise.  Residents are called "Idahoans". Idaho was admitted to the Union on July 3, 1890, as the 43rd state.

General reference 

 Names
 Common name: Idaho
 Pronunciation: 
 Official name: State of Idaho
 Abbreviations and name codes
 Postal symbol:  ID
 ISO 3166-2 code:  US-ID
 Internet second-level domain:  .id.us
 Nicknames
Gem State
 Gem of the Mountains
Little Ida
 Spud State
 Adjectival: Idaho
 Demonym: Idahoan

Geography of Idaho 

Geography of Idaho
 Idaho is: a U.S. state, a federal state of the United States of America
 Location:
 Northern hemisphere
 Western hemisphere
 Americas
 North America
 Anglo America
 Northern America
 United States of America
 Contiguous United States
 Canada–US border
 Western United States
 Mountain West United States
 Northwestern United States
 Pacific Northwest
 Population of Idaho: 1,567,582 (2010 U.S. Census)
 Area of Idaho:
 Atlas of Idaho

Places in Idaho 

Places in Idaho
 Cemeteries
 List of cemeteries in Idaho (A-L)
 List of cemeteries in Idaho (M-Z)
 Historic places in Idaho
 Ghost towns in Idaho
 National Historic Landmarks in Idaho
 National Register of Historic Places listings in Idaho
 Bridges on the National Register of Historic Places in Idaho
 National Natural Landmarks in Idaho
 National parks in Idaho
 State parks in Idaho

Environment of Idaho 

Environment of Idaho
 Climate of Idaho
 Protected areas in Idaho
 State forests of Idaho
 Superfund sites in Idaho
 Wildlife of Idaho
 Fauna of Idaho
 Birds of Idaho
 Amphibians and reptiles of Idaho

Natural geographic features of Idaho 
 Geology of Idaho
 List of mountain ranges in Idaho
 List of mountains of Idaho
 List of mountain peaks of Idaho
 Rivers of Idaho
 List of lakes in Idaho
 List of dams and reservoirs in Idaho

Regions of Idaho 

 Central Idaho
 Eastern Idaho
 Northern Idaho
 Southern Idaho
 Southwestern Idaho

Administrative divisions of Idaho 

 The 44 counties of the state of Idaho
 Municipalities in Idaho
 Cities in Idaho
 State capital of Idaho: Boise
 Largest city in Idaho: Boise (101st-largest city in the United States)
 City nicknames in Idaho

Demography of Idaho 

Demographics of Idaho

Government and politics of Idaho 

Politics of Idaho
 Form of government: U.S. state government
 United States congressional delegations from Idaho
 Idaho State Capitol
 Political party strength in Idaho

Branches of the government of Idaho 

Government of Idaho

Executive branch of the government of Idaho 
Governor of Idaho
Lieutenant Governor of Idaho
 Secretary of State of Idaho
 State departments
 Idaho Department of Commerce
 Idaho State Department of Education
 Idaho Department of Labor
 Idaho Department of Fish and Game
 Idaho Department of Juvenile Corrections
 Idaho Military Department
 Idaho Department of Transportation

Legislative branch of the government of Idaho 

 Idaho Legislature (bicameral)
 Upper house: Idaho Senate
 Lower house: Idaho House of Representatives

Judicial branch of the government of Idaho 

Courts of Idaho
 Supreme Court of Idaho

Law and order in Idaho 

Law of Idaho
 Cannabis in Idaho
 Capital punishment in Idaho
 Individuals executed in Idaho
 Constitution of Idaho
 Crime in Idaho
 Gun laws in Idaho
 Law enforcement in Idaho
 Law enforcement agencies in Idaho
 Idaho State Police

Military in Idaho 

 Idaho Air National Guard
 Idaho Army National Guard

History of Idaho

History of Idaho

History of Idaho, by period 

Indigenous peoples
Lewis and Clark Expedition, 1804–1806
Oregon Country, 1818–1846
Anglo-American Convention of 1818
Adams–Onis Treaty of 1819
Fort Hall, 1834–1863
Oregon Trail, 1841–1869
California Trail, 1841–1869
Provisional Government of Oregon, 1843–1848
Oregon Treaty, June 15, 1846
Unorganized territory of the United States, 1846–1848
Mexican–American War, April 25, 1846 – February 2, 1848
Territory of Oregon, 1848–1859
State of Deseret (extralegal), 1849–1850
Territory of Washington, (1853–1863)-1889
Territory of Idaho, 1863–1890
American Civil War, April 12, 1861 – May 13, 1865
Idaho in the American Civil War
Yellowstone National Park designated first United States National Park on March 1, 1872
Nez Perce War, 1877
Bannock War, 1878
State of Idaho becomes 43rd State admitted to the United States of America on July 3, 1890

History of Idaho, by region 
 History of Boise, Idaho

History of Idaho, by subject 
 Territorial evolution of Idaho

Culture of Idaho 

Culture of Idaho
 Museums in Idaho
 Religion in Idaho
 The Church of Jesus Christ of Latter-day Saints in Idaho
 Episcopal Diocese of Idaho
 Scouting in Idaho
 State symbols of Idaho
 Flag of the State of Idaho 
 Great Seal of the State of Idaho

The Arts in Idaho 
 Music of Idaho

Sports in Idaho 

Sports in Idaho

Economy and infrastructure of Idaho 

Economy of Idaho
 Agriculture in Idaho
 Communications in Idaho
 Newspapers in Idaho
 Radio stations in Idaho
 Television stations in Idaho
 Energy in Idaho
 Hydro power in Idaho
 Power stations in Idaho
 Solar power in Idaho
 Wind power in Idaho
 Health care in Idaho
 Hospitals in Idaho
 Transportation in Idaho
 Airports in Idaho
 Railroads in Idaho
 Roads in Idaho
State highways in Idaho

Education in Idaho 

Education in Idaho
 Schools in Idaho
 School districts in Idaho
 High schools in Idaho
 Colleges and universities in Idaho
 University of Idaho
 Idaho State University

See also

Topic overview:
Idaho

Index of Idaho-related articles

References

External links 

Idaho
Idaho